Nicolas Dupuis (born 6 January 1968) is a French football manager and former player who currently manages the Madagascar national team. He is also the technical director of FC Fleury 91.

Club career
Dupuis played amateur football in Auvergne-Rhône-Alpes for FC Souvigny, AS Yzeure, Cournon-d'Auvergne, US Beaumont and SA Thiers. At Yzeure, Dupuis played and managed 682 matches in all competitions.

Managerial career
In August 1996, Dupuis became the manager of Yzeure. During his time at the club, Yzeure were promoted to the Championnat National in 2006, as well as beating Ligue 1 club Lorient 1–0 in the 2013–14 Coupe de France on 4 January 2014, before losing to Lyon 3–1 on 22 January 2014 in the round of 32.

In March 2017, Dupuis was appointed as the manager of the Madagascar national team. On 16 October 2018, Madagascar qualified for the 2019 Africa Cup of Nations after beating Equatorial Guinea 1–0 in Antananarivo, marking the nation's first ever AFCON appearance. The team went on to reach the quarter-finals.

In January 2019, it was announced that Dupuis would combine his role as Madagascar manager with that of French club FC Fleury 91's technical director. In March 2019, Madagascar extended his contract until after the 2019 AFCON. His contract expired in July 2019, but in September 2019, it was extended for four more years.

In April 2021, the Malagasy Football Federation suspended Dupuis without pay for "neglecting his managerial duties in order to pursue commercial interests for personal publicity", with Éric Rabésandratana taking charge of the national team whilst Dupuis served his suspension.

References

External links
 Nicolas Dupuis Interview

1968 births
Living people
Sportspeople from Moulins, Allier
French footballers
Association football defenders
Moulins Yzeure Foot players
Madagascar national football team managers
Expatriate football managers in Madagascar
French expatriate sportspeople in Madagascar
French football managers
French expatriate football managers
2019 Africa Cup of Nations managers
Footballers from Auvergne-Rhône-Alpes